Roger Vidosa Riba (born February 29, 1984 in La Massana) was an Andorran alpine skier. He represented Andorra at the 2006 Winter Olympics and at the 2010 Winter Olympics.

Best results

FIS Race results 

Slalom

1st place - 5 times
2nd place - 9 times
3rd place - 3 times

Giant Slalom

1st place - 5 times
2nd place - 7 times
3rd place - 1 time

FIS World Cup 

Super Combined - 22
Downhill - 46
Super G - 33

Olympic Games 

 2006 Winter Olympics 

Combined - 28
Downhill - 50
Slalom - 27

 2010 Winter Olympics 

Downhill - 48
Super G - 33
Super combined - 25

World Ski Championships 

 2005 Bormio World Ski Championships 

Giant Slalom - 39
Slalom - 36

 2007 Are World Ski Championships 

Downhill - 46
Super G - 55
SuperCombined - 28

After retirement

Vidosa retired as an Alpine Skier in April 2013. After retirement he became a Ski Instructor in Andorra for 5 months and then in Leeds, United Kingdom for 10 months. He took up the job of a Personal Trainer in July 2013 at The Gym Group in Leeds, UK for a year.

He studied at Paul Sabatier University for a year and became Strength and Conditioning Coach at Track League of Midi-Pyrenees, Toulouse Area, France  in December 2014 where he works till date.

Notes

References

External links 
 
 
 
 LinkedIn profile

1984 births
Living people
Andorran male alpine skiers
Olympic alpine skiers of Andorra
Alpine skiers at the 2006 Winter Olympics
Alpine skiers at the 2010 Winter Olympics
People from La Massana